Iouliti "Lolita" Lymoura (born 10 March 1985) is a retired Greek basketball player who last played for Panathinaikos. She was a valuable member of the senior women's Greek national team Greek national team from 2002 to 2018.

References

External links

1985 births
Living people
Greek expatriate basketball people in Italy
Greek women's basketball players
Basketball players from Piraeus
Point guards
Panathinaikos WBC players
PAOK Women's Basketball players